People's Square is a metro station on Line 2 and Line 5 in China. It is located in the Xiaoshan District of Hangzhou. The initial name of the station was People Square and it was changed to People's Square in 2015. The station of Line 2 was opened on 24 November 2014, and become a transfer station since the opening of Line 5 on 23 April 2020. The station has 9 entrances.

References

Railway stations in Zhejiang
Railway stations in China opened in 2014
Hangzhou Metro stations